The Grammy Award for Best Country Solo Performance is an award presented at the Grammy Awards, a ceremony that was established in 1958 and originally called the Gramophone Awards. According to the 54th Grammy Awards description guide it is designed for solo (vocal or instrumental) country recordings and is limited to singles or tracks only.

The award combines the previous categories for Best Female Country Vocal Performance, Best Male Country Vocal Performance and Best Country Instrumental Performance (if it is an instrumental solo performance). The restructuring of these categories was a result of the Recording Academy's wish to decrease the list of categories and awards and to eliminate the distinctions between male and female performances.

Recipients

Artists with multiple wins

3 wins
 Chris Stapleton

2 wins
 Carrie Underwood
 Willie Nelson

Artists with multiple nominations

6 nominations
 Miranda Lambert

5 nominations
 Carrie Underwood

4 nominations
 Maren Morris
 Blake Shelton
 Chris Stapleton
 Keith Urban

3 nominations
 Eric Church
 Hunter Hayes

2 nominations
 Brandy Clark
 Mickey Guyton
 Kacey Musgraves
 Willie Nelson

See also
Grammy Award for Best Country Duo/Group Performance
Grammy Award for Best Country Song
Grammy Award for Best Country Album

References

External links 
 Official Site of the Grammy Awards

Grammy Awards for country music
Awards established in 2012
Country Solo Performance